Losst and Founnd is a posthumous album by American musician and songwriter Harry Nilsson.  The album is a collection of recordings made by Nilsson in the final years of his life.

Background

In the early 1990s, Nilsson was ready to return to music after a decade since his last studio album.  But after a disastrous meeting with Warner Bros. Records where he was turned down by the label, Nilsson and his then producer Mark Hudson began work by themselves on the then tentatively titled Papa's Got a Brown New Robe album.

Nilsson suffered a heart attack on February 14, 1993. After surviving that, he began pressing his former label, RCA Records, to release a boxed-set retrospective of his career (released in 1995 as Personal Best), and resumed recording, attempting to complete his final album. Nilsson died of heart failure on January 15, 1994, in his Agoura Hills, California home, at the age of 52.

Before he died, Nilsson did finish the vocal tracks for the album with producer Mark Hudson, who held onto the tapes of that session for nearly 25 years in hopes of finishing the material.  Since Nilsson's death, various demos from these sessions appeared on bootlegs over the years.  In 2006 Warner/Chappell released a promotional only compilation of Nilsson's music titled Perfect Day – The Songs of Nilsson 1971–1993, which featured versions of the songs "Animal Farm" and "U.C.L.A.".

With the blessing of Harry Nilsson's estate, the album was completed and retitled Losst and Founnd (after a comment Nilsson made after the meeting with Warner Bros. – “they thought I was lost, but I was found”).

The final album was released on November 22, 2019.

Track listing
All music and lyrics by Harry Nilsson, except where noted.

"Lost and Found" (Harry Nilsson, Mark Hudson, Steve Dudas) – 4:02
"Woman Oh Woman" – 3:16
"U.C.L.A." – 4:21
"Hi-Heel Sneakers/Rescue Boy Medley" (Robert Higginbotham)/(Harry Nilsson, Mark Hudson) – 3:58
"Lullaby" – 3:11
"Animal Farm" – 4:54
"Listen, the Snow Is Falling" (Yoko Ono) – 4:01
"Try" (Harry Nilsson, Mark Hudson) – 3:15
"Love Is the Answer" – 3:56
"Yo Dodger Blue" – 3:14
"What Does a Woman See in a Man" (Jimmy Webb) – 5:01

References

Harry Nilsson albums
2019 albums
Omnivore Recordings albums
Albums produced by Mark Hudson (musician)
Albums published posthumously